Alexei Grigorievich Eriomin (March 17, 1919 – June 11, 1998) was a Russian Soviet realist painter, People's Artist of the Russian Federation, who lived and worked in Saint Petersburg (former Leningrad). He was a member of the Saint Petersburg Union of Artists (before 1992 named as the Leningrad branch of Union of Artists of Russian Federation), and regarded as one of the representatives of the Leningrad school of painting, most famous for his paintings devoted to peoples and nature of Northern Karelia.

Biography 
Alexei Grigorievich Eriomin was born March 17, 1919, in the village of Velikaya Guba, located at the shore of Onega Lake in Northern Karelia.

In 1930 Alexei Eriomin comes to Leningrad. In 1935-1939 he studied in the Leningrad Secondary Art School under All-Russian Academy of Arts.

In 1939 he was drafted into the Red Army. As a tankman Alexei Eriomin took part in the German-Soviet War of the Soviet people against Nazi Germany and its allies. He was wounded and marked by military awards.

After demobilization in 1945 Alexei Eriomin entered at the first course of Department of Painting at the Leningrad Institute of Painting, Sculpture and Architecture named after Ilya Repin, where he studied of Boris Fogel, Semion Abugov, Alexander Debler, and Alexander Zaytsev.

In 1951 Alexei Eriomin graduated from the Leningrad Institute of Painting, Sculpture and Architecture in Boris Ioganson studio, together with Nikolai Baskakov, Mikhail Kaneev, Maya Kopitseva, Anatoli Levitin, Avenir Parkhomenko, Arseny Semionov, Mikhail Trufanov, Boris Ugarov, and other young artists. His graduation work was genre painting "Lenin on the hunting in Siberian exile" 
 
Since 1939 Alexei Eriomin has participated in Art Exhibitions. He painted genre and historical paintings, portraits, landscapes, sketches from the life. Alexei Eriomin was most famous for his paintings devoted to peoples and nature of Northern Karelija.

Since 1951 Alexei Eriomin was a member of the Leningrad Union of Artists. Alexai Eriomin was awarded the honorary titles of the Honored Artist of the RSFSR (1970), and the People's Artist of the Russian Federation (1978).
 
Alexei Grigorievich Eriomin died on June 11, 1998, in Saint Petersburg at the eightieth year of life. His paintings reside in State Russian Museum, State Tretyakov Gallery, in Art museums and private collections in the Russia, Japan, England, Finland, and other countries.

Honours and awards
 Order of the Red Star
 Order of the Red Banner
 Medal "For the Victory over Germany in the Great Patriotic War 1941–1945"
 Order of the Patriotic War, 2nd class

See also

 Fine Art of Leningrad
 Leningrad School of Painting
 List of Russian artists
 List of painters of Saint Petersburg Union of Artists
 List of the Russian Landscape painters
 Saint Petersburg Union of Artists

References

Bibliography 
 Golenky Georgy. Alexei Eriomin. Leningrad, Khudozhnik RSFSR, 1985.
 Matthew C. Bown. Dictionary of 20th Century Russian and Soviet Painters 1900-1980s. London: Izomar, 1998. , .
 Time for change. The Art of 1960-1985 in the Soviet Union. Saint Petersburg: State Russian Museum, 2006. p. 174.
 Sergei V. Ivanov. Unknown Socialist Realism. The Leningrad School. Saint Petersburg: NP-Print Edition, 2007. – pp. 9, 15, 18, 20, 21, 27, 29, 30, 195, 271, 360, 384, 388, 390, 392-395, 397-402, 404-407, 411, 413-424. , .
 Дмитренко А. Ф. Люблю людей… (О народном художнике России А. Г. Ерёмине) // Петербургские искусствоведческие тетради. Вып. 9. СПб, 2007. С.233—244.
 Artists of Peter's Academy of Arts and Sciences. Saint Petersburg: Ladoga Edition, 2008. - pp. 58–59.

1919 births
1998 deaths
20th-century Russian painters
Russian male painters
Honored Artists of the Russian Federation
Leningrad Secondary Art School alumni
Leningrad School artists
Members of the Leningrad Union of Artists
People's Artists of Russia (visual arts)
Recipients of the Order of the Red Banner
Repin Institute of Arts alumni
Russian landscape painters
Socialist realist artists
Soviet military personnel of World War II
Soviet painters
20th-century Russian male artists